The Dongfeng Rich is a compact pickup truck produced by the Dongfeng Nissan joint venture of Chinese auto manufacturer Dongfeng Motor Corporation.

First generation

The first generation Dongfeng Rich is a pickup truck and a SUV based on the design of the Nissan D22 pickup truck due to the Dongfeng-Nissan joint venture using the Nissan F-Alpha platform. It is produced as a pickup and an SUV, which is essentially the pickup with a long roof bed cover.

Second generation

The second generation Rich pickup is also based on the same Nissan platform, and was later rebadged as a Peugeot in some markets.

Peugeot Pick Up
Due to the Dongfeng Peugeot-Citroën joint venture between PSA and Dongfeng, it was revealed in July 2017 that Dongfeng will manufacture a badge-engineered version of the Dongfeng Rich double cab pickup as the Peugeot Pickup, and the rebadged pickup would be on sale in Africa starting from September 2017.

Rich 6 

A more upmarket model named the Rich 6 was launched in 2017 selling alongside the regular Dongfeng Rich. It is based on the third generation Nissan Navara with only the front end restyled. It is also available as an EV with a 68kWh battery and a single 120kW/420Nm electric motor.

A 5-door SUV bodystyle was also available as the Palazzo (Palasuo, 帕拉索).

Powertrain and performance
There are two engines available for the Rich 6. The 2.4-litre gasoline engine of the Rich 6 has a maximum power output of 158ps and peak torque of 230 Nm, mated to a 5-speed manual gearbox; the 2.5-litre turbo diesel engine of the Rich 6 has a maximum power output of 140 ps and a peak torque of 305 Nm, matched with a 5-speed manual gearbox and a 6-speed automatic gearbox from ZF with economic, sports and snow driving mode. The four-wheel drive system is supplied by BorgWarner, but without a rear axle differential lock. The suspension structure is front double wishbone and rear leaf spring, while the elastic element is 5 pieces of variable section steel plate. In terms of the off-road capabilities, the approach angle, departure angle and minimum ground clearance of Rich 6 is 31°, 20°, and 207mm. The Rich 6 is equipped with 255/70 R16 tires, with front disc brakes and rear drum brakes as standard.

References

External links

 China Auto web
 Net Car Show

Rich
Pickup
Cars introduced in 2009
Cars introduced in 2017
Cars of China
Pickup trucks
Sport utility vehicles
Rear-wheel-drive vehicles